Park's Gap Bridge is a historic Howe Truss bridge located near Martinsburg, at Tomahawk, Berkeley County, West Virginia. It is a simple span pony truss supported on stone abutments.

It was listed on the National Register of Historic Places in 1994.

References

Road bridges on the National Register of Historic Places in West Virginia
Bridges completed in 1892
Buildings and structures in Berkeley County, West Virginia
National Register of Historic Places in Berkeley County, West Virginia